Wesley Karlos Piedade (born April 27, 1989 in São Paulo), is a Brazilian goalkeeper. He currently plays for Galícia.

Contract
1 July 2007 to 30 July 2010

See also
Football in Brazil
List of football clubs in Brazil

References

External links
Galícia E.C. Official Site

1989 births
Footballers from São Paulo
Living people
Brazilian footballers
Galícia Esporte Clube players
Association football goalkeepers